Dryopteris varia is a species of fern in the family Dryopteridaceae.

The species is native to China, Japan, Korea, Myanmar, Philippines, Taiwan, Vietnam, Sulawesi, and the Ryukyu Islands.

References 

varia
Ferns of Asia